On 24 April 2018, 11 people were attacked with fire inside a bus in the district of Miraflores, in Lima, Peru. One of them, 22-year old Eyvi Ágreda, who was the target of the attack, died more than a month later in the hospital. The attacker was identified as Carlos Hualpa Vacas, who belonged to the victim's work environment.

Attack 
It was around seven o'clock at night., and a man with covered with a hood and dark glasses got on the bus and he sat on the back of the vehicle. Then got up and moved forward three seats to spray a fuel a woman who was sitting and after set fire to her, which also reached at least 10 other passengers, and finally escaped the scene by burning him-self arm a little.

Investigation 
The testimonies of the witnesses, the recordings of the security cameras, as well as a clue given by the sister of the mortal victim helped to find the author of this fact.

Hualpa Vacas had asked absent him-self from his job the day after the attack because his arm was burned. This coincides with the version of the bus driver, who said that the author of the attack fled with his limb on fire, a crucial detail.

The bus driver also said that Hualpa Vacas had his head covered with a green hood and dark glasses; Other witnesses added that he was wearing a black backpack. The security cameras of the area captured a person with these characteristics.

The victim's sister had received a warning message before the attack. She had asked him to wait for her at the bus station, because she was afraid of "a man named Javier who was chasing her".

The police went to the workplace of Hualpa Vacas, which he had to enter at 9:00 a.m, but when they knew he was on leave because the previous night had suffered an accident, they reinforced his hypothesis.

When Hualpa Vacas peeked out at the door of his house he was intervened and immediately reduced, and it was confirmed that he had a burn on his left hand and forearm, as reported by the driver of the bus in which the attack occurred.

In his testimony to the Police, Hualpa revealed in detail his plan. And according to the policemen who questioned him, without showing any remorse.

Hualpa Vacas wanted to justify his actions and pointed out that he did not want to kill Eyvi Ágreda if not "just disfigure her" and that he had planned the attack long time ago, so a month earlier he bought the gasoline in a yogurt bottle, but it had no value for execute it.

One of the versions that he formulated is that he had injured himself cooking in his house; but he also said that he burned himself because he was very nervous when he realized that his name was given as a suspect. "When nobody had mentioned it with certainty and we had only given his second name," one of the policemen explained.

The truth is that he could not say where he was treated for the burn he presents, which is bandaged after application of a substance, probably to relieve pain.

This case received extensive media coverage, both for the number of victims of this attack and for the way in which Eyvi was attacked. This was a representative case of the high numbers of murders of women registered in Peru.

Reactions 
 César Villanueva, president of Ministers Council, tweeted: "The National Police is in full investigation of the facts to find the person responsible for this attack, we are going to incorporate the most drastic measures to solve this problem, which is so unacceptable, that it is acts of violence against women". In addition, he assured that the Ministry of the Interior had deployed the necessary work teams to capture the person responsible for this crime.
 The Ombudsman Office highlighted "the need to approve a criminal type that sanctions the different manifestations of harassment that allows effective protection to victims."
Fiorella Molinelli, president of Essalud, visited the victim at the hospital on 25 April. In statements to journalists, he condemned the attack: "The whole weight of the law must fall on this man who has attempted against the lives of many people," she said.
Ana María Mendieta, Minister of Woman and Vulnerable Populations, affirmed that only prevention will make it possible to reduce cases of femicide in the country. He also appealed to "exemplary sanctions" applied by the judicial authorities to the aggressors, according to Andina state news agency.

See also 
 NiUnaMenos (Peru)

References 

Crime in Lima
Attacks in Peru
Violent deaths in Peru
Violence against women in Peru
2018 murders in Peru